Antony is a Danish, English, Finnish, German, Norwegian and Swedish given name that is a form of Anthony. As a surname it is derived from the Antonius root name. People with this name include the following:

Given name
 Mark Antony (83–30 BC), Roman politician and general 
 Anthony the Great (c. 251–356), also known as Antony, Egyptian saint
 Antony the Younger (785–865), Byzantine soldier, monk and Eastern Orthodox saint
 Anthony of Sourozh (Bloom, 1914–2003) of Sourozh, Russian Orthodox bishop
 Antony (Khrapovitsky) (1863–1936) of Kiev, Russian Orthodox bishop
 Antony (footballer, born 2000) (Antony Matheus dos Santos), Brazilian footballer
 Antony (footballer, born 2001) (Antony Alves Santos), Brazilian footballer
 Antony Acland (1930–2021), British diplomat and Provost of Eton College
 Antony Armstrong-Jones, 1st Earl of Snowdon (1930–2017), English photographer and filmmaker, husband of Princess Margaret
 Antony de Ávila (born 1962), Colombian footballer
 Antony Beevor (born 1946), English military historian
 Antony Blinken (born 1962), American government administrator and secretary of state of the United States
 Antony Caceres (born 2000), Canadian soccer player
 Antony Clark (born 1956), South African educationalist
 Antony Duff (1920–2000), British diplomat and Director General of MI5
 Antony Flew (1923–2010), English philosopher
 Antony Gormley (born 1950), British sculptor
 Antony Green (born 1960), Australian psephologist and commentator
 Antony Hämäläinen (born 1980), Finnish musician, singer and composer
 Antony Hewish (1924–2021), British radio astronomer, Nobel Prize for Physics
 Antony Jay (1930–2016), English writer, broadcaster and director
 Antony Johnston (born 1972), British writer of comics, video games and novels
 Tony Newton, Baron Newton of Braintree (1937–2012), British politician
 Antony Padiyara (1921–2000), Indian Roman Catholic archbishop and cardinal
 Antony Pappusamy (born 1949), Indian Roman Catholic archbishop
 Antony Lopez Peralta (born 1981), French footballer
 Antony Raju (born 1954), Indian politician
 Antony Sher (1949–2021), English actor
 Antony Starr (born 1975), New Zealand television actor
 Antony C. Sutton (1925–2002), British and American economist, historian and writer
 Antony Valentini (born 1965), British theoretical physicist
 Tony Whitlam (born 1944), Australian lawyer, judge, politician and son of former Australian Prime Minister Gough Whitlam

Surname
 A. K. Antony (born 1940), Indian politician, former Defence Minister of India and three-time Chief Minister of the state of Kerala
 Anto Antony (born 1956), Indian politician
 Johny Antony, Indian film director
 P. J. Antony (1925–1979), Indian stage and film actor
 Steve Antony, British children's author and illustrator

See also

 Anthony (disambiguation)
Antona (name)
Antone
 Antoni, a given name and surname
 Antonie (disambiguation)
Antono (name)

References

Danish masculine given names
English masculine given names
Finnish masculine given names
German masculine given names
Norwegian masculine given names
Swedish masculine given names

bg:Антоний